Scott Findlay (born 16 October 1983) is a former Scottish professional footballer who played as a goalkeeper for Dundee and Livingston.

Club career
Findlay started his career at St Johnstone before moving on to Livingston in 2001.  However he didn't make his first senior team appearance until 2002 during a loan spell at East Stirling.  The Shire fell to a 4-1 defeat to East Fife on 10 August 2002.

He signed for Cowdenbeath in 2004 on a short term deal but failed to make an appearance for the club.

The Perth born keeper had a short lived spell at Alloa under Alan Maitland. Findlay was 'badly at fault' as Alloa threw away a two goal lead during one of his rare appearances, against Ayr United in 2007. 'All the goals were saveable' a bewildered Maitland said post-match.

The goalkeeper signed for Clyde in 2010 and made 2 appearances.

Coaching career
Findlay is currently head goalkeeper coach at St Johnstone.

References

External links
Scott Findlay on Soccerbase

1983 births
Living people
Scottish footballers
Scottish Football League players
Association football forwards
St Johnstone F.C. players
Livingston F.C. players
East Stirlingshire F.C. players
Dundee F.C. players
Clyde F.C. players
Raith Rovers F.C. players
Alloa Athletic F.C. players
Footballers from Perth, Scotland